A sacral fracture is a break in the sacrum bone. The sacrum is the large triangular bone that forms the last part of the vertebral column from the fusion of the five sacral vertebrae. Sacral fractures are relatively uncommon. They tend to be caused by high-energy trauma, for example in road traffic accidents or in falls.

They are heterogenous (which means the bone can break in several different places, in several different ways) and almost always appear together with other injuries. This makes them difficult to diagnose and treat.

As with other types of fractures, osteoporosis is a risk factor.

The management may or may not include surgery.

Classification
The Denis Classification System classified sacral fractures into three regions according to the part of the bone affected. The location of the fracture has a major influence on symptoms experienced.
 Zone 1 (ala), may cause disruption to the nerve root of the fifth lumbar vertebra (L5) 
 Zone 2 (sacral foramina), may cause sciatica
 Zone 3 (sacral canal), may cause cauda equina syndrome

See also
Coccyx fracture (broken tailbone)

References

Bone fractures